Oxalis schaeferi is a species of plant in the family Oxalidaceae. It is endemic to Namibia.  Its natural habitat is cold desert.

References

Flora of Namibia
schaeferi
Least concern plants
Taxonomy articles created by Polbot